The 1975 Royal Tru-Orange season was the maiden season of the franchise in the Philippine Basketball Association (PBA).

First Conference standings

Summary
The Royal Tru-Orangemen were among the top four teams which made it to semifinal round in the PBA's very first conference. They lost all their six games in the two-round semifinals and placed fourth behind champion Toyota, runner-up Crispa, and third place U-Tex. In the second conference, Royal had a pair of Harry Brown and Steve Smith as their imports. The Orangemen were in their second semifinal stint and this time, they won two out of their six assignments, not enough to make it even in a playoff berth. Royal played Noritake in the best-of-five series for third place and after winning Game One, 125-122, the Orangemen lost the next two games and with Crispa forfeiting Game four of the finals against Toyota, the Orangemen ended up fourth place again. They completed a fourth place finish in all three conferences of the season as the Orangemen, despite beating U-Tex in the round-robin All-Philippine championship, they lost to U-Tex in five games in their series for third place.

Roster

References

External links
 Crispa-Toyota rivalry

San Miguel Beermen seasons
Royal Tru-Orange